Clathrodrillia solida, common name the solid drillia, is a species of sea snail, a marine gastropod mollusk in the family Drilliidae.

Description
The color of the shell is deep chocolate-brown. Its longitudinal ribs are separated by wider interspaces, crossed by revolving raised lines, forming granules. It is smooth and slightly concave above the periphery, with a raised line next the suture. The shell grows to a length of 19 mm.

Distribution
This marine species occurs in the Caribbean Sea, the Gulf of Mexico and in the West Indies.

References

 Rosenberg, G.; Moretzsohn, F.; García, E. F. (2009). Gastropoda (Mollusca) of the Gulf of Mexico, pp. 579–699 in: Felder, D.L. and D.K. Camp (eds.), Gulf of Mexico–Origins, Waters, and Biota. Texas A&M Press, College Station, Texas

External links
 
 Tippett D.L. (2006). The genus Strictispira in the western Atlantic (Gastropoda: Conoidea). Malacologia. 48(1-2): 43-64.

solida
Gastropods described in 1850